The HP-71B was a hand-held computer or calculator programmable in BASIC, made by Hewlett-Packard from 1984 to 1989.

Description
Smaller and less expensive (US$595  MSRP) than the preceding model HP-75, the 71B had a single-line 22-character liquid crystal display, 64K system ROM and 17.5K user memory.  It operated on four AAA batteries. Four plug-in ports permitted ROM-based programs or additional user memory to be added.  Separate compartments could accommodate an optional magnetic card reader and an optional HP-IL interface (HP 82401A) that could be used to connect printers, storage and electronic test equipment.

The 71B was the first handheld to implement the IEEE  854-1987 radix-independent floating-point standard.  Programming features included a real-time clock, programmable timers and subroutine calls with parameter passing and recursion.  It was also HP's first calculator based on the Saturn processor, later versions of which are found in the popular HP-48 series calculators and most more recent HP calculator models.

Since the hand-pulled magnetic cards (HP-75 compatible) could only store two tracks of 650 bytes each, the card reader (installed under the logo plate above the numeric keyboard) was not a very popular option.  Larger storage capacities could be accommodated through HP-IL peripherals such as the 82161A cassette drive or 9114A diskette drive that were also battery-powered and portable, if rather bulky compared to the 71B.  Subsequently, memory expansion modules to fit the card reader compartment became available from third-party vendors.

Other third-party options included a bar code wand and application ROMs to plug into one of the four memory ports.  A HP-71 configuration with bar code wand and a custom application was widely used for data collection in the British Department of Health and Social Security (DHSS).

Unlike HP-75 or HP-41, the 71B could also act as a device in a HP-IL loop controlled by another device, allowing several of them in the same loop, communicating with each other (or an HP-75 or HP-41) or sharing peripherals. Using an HP 82402 Dual HP-IL controller, it was even possible to connect one 71B to two HP-IL loops simultaneously, possibly as a controller in one and as a device in another.

The HP-71B could optionally be made compatible with the large volume of programs written for the HP-41  series of calculators via a plug-in ROM that emulated the HP-41 at about 5x the original speed.

Internal Design Specification
Another notable "feature" of the 71B was that HP sold to the public a series of documents (IDS: Internal Design Specification) containing the nearly complete internal engineering details of the unit.  A series of four IDSes were published about the software contained in the 71B's ROM; this included the complete source code (in assembly language) for the entire contents of ROM, and extensive additional design documentation of the ROM software.  Other IDSes were released covering the 71B's hardware, the Forth/Assembler add-in ROM, and the add-in HP-IL controller.

Notes

External links
 HP-71B at the MoHPC
 HP Journal, July 1984 Issue dedicated to HP-71B, articles on design and packaging (with exploded views)
 HP-71B pictures on MyCalcDB (database about 70s and 80s pocket calculators)
 HP-71B Compendium of information related to the handheld computer
HP-71 Reference Manual

71B
Pocket computers
Computer-related introductions in 1984